Le Spectacle du Monde is a French language magazine published in France. Although it was closed in 2014, the magazine was restarted in 2019.

Overview
Le Spectacle du Monde was launched by Raymond Bourgine in 1962. The magazine was published on a monthly basis. It billed itself as political, geopolitical and cultural news publication. It was most recently owned by Valmonde which closed it in 2014. The last issue was published in July-August 2014. Valmonde relaunched the publication on 31 January 2019.

References

1962 establishments in France
2014 disestablishments in France
Cultural magazines
French-language magazines
Monthly magazines published in France
Political magazines published in France
Magazines established in 1962
Magazines disestablished in 2014
Magazines established in 2019
Magazines published in Paris